Ken Clark is an American politician, who served as a Democratic member of the Arizona House of Representatives representing District 24 from 2015 to 2019.

Elections
 2014 – Ken Clark and Lela Alston defeated Richard Bauer in the Democratic primary. Alston and Clark defeated Lei Lani Cortez in the general election.
 2010 – Clark was defeated by Lela Alston and Katie Hobbs in the Democratic primary election on August 24, 2010.

References

External links
 Official page at the Arizona State Legislature
 Biography at Ballotpedia

Living people
Democratic Party members of the Arizona House of Representatives
Politicians from Phoenix, Arizona
Northern Arizona University alumni
21st-century American politicians
Year of birth missing (living people)